The 2008 Princeton Tigers football team was an American football team that represented Princeton University in the 2008 NCAA Division I FCS football season. Princeton averaged 9,383 fans per game.

The Tigers played their home games at Powers Field at Princeton Stadium on the university campus in Princeton, New Jersey.

Schedule

References

Princeton
Princeton Tigers football seasons
Princeton Tigers football